Karl-Hans Kern (3 October 1932 – 21 May 2014) was a German politician (SPD) and member of the Bundestag from 1967 until 1976.

Kern also served as a delegate for Germany at the United Nations General Assembly.

References

External links 
 Personal obituary 
 Political obituary 

1932 births
2014 deaths
People from Heilbronn
Members of the Bundestag for Baden-Württemberg
University of Tübingen alumni
University of Göttingen alumni
Members of the Bundestag for the Social Democratic Party of Germany